Interstellar Probe (ISP) is a proposed NASA space probe designed to explore and characterize the heliosphere and interstellar space. The study was originally proposed in 2018 by NASA for the Applied Physics Laboratory. It would have a baseline launch between 2036 and 2041.

The probe may have the opportunity to encounter minor planets on the way out, including Orcus and Quaoar, though such flybys would require specific launch dates. With next-generation radioisotope thermoelectric generators (RTGs), the mission would be designed to last for over 50 years after its launch, a similar feat reached by the Voyager 1 and 2 probes despite their intended 5-year lifetime. The mission has been called "Voyager on steroids".

Mission background

Interstellar probes such as the Voyager program were made only with the intent to visit the outer planets, with the added interstellar mission as a mere bonus. Their lifetime had never been expected to be much longer than 12 years at the most, but the probes have lasted for upwards of four decades thus far. Both Voyagers left the heliosphere in the 2010s; Voyager 1 in 2013, and 2 in 2018. 

While their readings have been valuable, many of their instruments have been shut off due to a lack of power in their RTGs. In addition, neither of them are headed toward the IBEX ribbon, a region discovered by the Interstellar Boundary Explorer where energetic neutral atoms (ENAs) seem to highly affect the heliosphere and are able to breach it at unprecedented rates.

Primary science goals

The main goals of the Interstellar mission include characterizing the heliosphere as a habitable astrosphere by its global nature, its interactions with the Sun and the interstellar medium, and the nature of said interstellar medium. Similar goals may include viewing the Sun as a habitable exoplanetary system from beyond, with potential outbound giant or dwarf planet flybys along the way depending on chosen launch date, and understanding the universe from beyond the heliosphere.

Scientific instruments

One would prioritize Lyman-alpha science, whereas the other would prioritize visible and infrared imaging of flyby targets. Payloads highlighted in red are exclusive to the baseline payload. Instruments in green are intended for the augmented flyby payload.

Mission operations

Launch and trajectories

The baseline launch would be in 2036 using a Space Launch System in its Block 2 configuration, featuring an additional Centaur and Star 48BV booster. This launch would put the probe on a direct trajectory to Jupiter, and after a mere seven months the probe would make a gravity assist to speed out at about 95 km/s (about 216000 mph). Alternative trajectories include bringing the Star 48 booster for a burn upon closest approach; one trajectory involving that burn at Jupiter with a slightly longer transit time, and another with about the same transit time, but passing ahead of Jupiter for a dive down near the Sun for an even faster escape trajectory.

Further trajectory options have been considered, including performing flybys of Saturn, Uranus, or Neptune depending on launch date to help characterize planetary formation and complement missing data sets, and dwarf planets to help characterize them as New Horizons did in 2015 with its flyby of Pluto.

See also

 Interstellar Express, a proposed pair of probes by China made to explore the outer solar system and heliosphere.
 New Horizons, a Pluto flyby mission by NASA currently en route to explore the interstellar medium.

References

NASA space probes
Proposed space probes
Missions to Jupiter
Missions to minor planets